Libya made its Paralympic Games début as the Great Socialist People's Libyan Arab Jamahiriya at the 1996 Summer Paralympics in Atlanta, sending four representatives to compete in powerlifting. The country has competed at every edition of the Summer Paralympics since then, but has never taken part in the Winter Paralympics. Libyan delegations have always been fairly small: three judokas, two powerlifters and a volleyball team in 2000; two powerlifters in 2004; a powerlifter and two table tennis players in 2008.

Libya won its first—and so far only—Paralympic medal when Abdelrahim Hamed took bronze in the men's over 100 kg in powerlifting in 2000, lifting .

Medal tables

Medals by Summer Games

Medals by Summer sport

See also
 Libya at the Olympics

References